Ogōri Station may refer to:
 Ogōri Station on the Amagi Railway Amagi Line in Ogōri, Fukuoka, Japan
 Nishitetsu Ogōri Station on the Nishitetsu Tenjin Ōmuta Line in Ogōri, Fukuoka, Japan
 Shin-Yamaguchi Station in Yamaguchi, Yamaguchi, Japan, formerly called Ogōri Station